Nam Woo-hyun (born February 8, 1991), known mononymously as Woohyun, is a South Korean singer, songwriter and actor known for his work as a member of South Korean boy group Infinite. 

Nam began his solo career in 2016 with released EP Write.., which charted at number two on Gaon Album Chart and number nine on the Billboard World Albums chart. Since then, he continued to release more solo music, Second Write.. (2018), A New Journey (2019), and With (2021).

Life and career

Early life and career beginnings
Nam Woo-hyun was born and raised in Seoul, South Korea. He graduated from Dong-ah Institute of Media and Arts, majoring in Applied Music. He has an older brother, Nam Boo-hyun, who is the owner of BBQ restaurant Meok & Sam.

Nam initially aspired to be a soccer player. However, he could not pursue this dream and eventually realized his dream of becoming a singer when he was in high school, and auditioned at Woollim Entertainment along with two other agencies, one of which was YG Entertainment, to pursue a career as a solo singer. He passed the audition and was accepted into Woollim with a cover of Stevie Wonder's "Lately" and began training as an idol trainee. He admitted being a little disappointed but worked hard to practice dancing instead.

Nam began his career as a model for a shopping mall alongside Beast's Junhyung and T-ara's Jiyeon. He also competed in the 6th Hello Star Contest performing Lee Hyori's "U Go Girl". In one of his first broadcast appearances, he played the lead role in KooPD's music video for Guigamalo in 2007. Later in 2009, he appeared on Mnet's Girl Punch and sang Lee Seung-gi's "Words That Are Hard to Say".

Nam officially debuted as a member of Infinite on June 9, 2010.
In September 2011, Nam joined Immortal Songs 2 as a fixed member. His first performance on the show aired on October 1. On November 1, it was announced that he would be leaving the show due to Infinite's upcoming Japanese promotions, and his final episode was aired November 5. He later made two more additional appearances on the show, once by himself in January 2012 and again with group mate Sungkyu in December 2012.

2012–2015: Solo activities and Toheart
In 2012, his career in musical theatre began with a supporting role in the musical Gwanghwamun Sonata. Nam and Sungkyu shared the role of Jiyong, the son of the female lead. The musical ran in Korea from January 3 to March 11, 2012, and in Japan from January 4 to 6, 2013. Nam made his first foray into acting in August with a minor role in the drama The Thousandth Man.

In February 2013, he released a duet song titled "Cactus" (선인장) with South Korean Indie Singer, Lucia. It is a cover of Epitone Project's song of the same, and was included as part of a special project album, Re;code.

On February 20, 2014, SM Entertainment announced the formation of a special unit, Toheart, consisting of Nam and Shinee's Key.  Toheart debuted with their first mini album and title track Delicious on March 10 and made their live debut on March 12 through a MelOn Premiere Showcase. In April, Nam was cast in a lead role for the KBS drama Hi! School: Love On alongside Kim Sae-ron and group mate Lee Sung-yeol, playing the character Shin Woo-hyun. Nam released a soundtrack "When Love Comes" for SBS drama Modern Farmer on October 24, 2014. In December, Nam directed the horror short film What Happened in Hong Kong.

Nam currently plays as a striker for the South Korean celebrity football club, FC Men. Having previously played for FC One, he was recruited to FC Men in early 2015. He made his football debut with FC Men on May 17, 2015, in a charity match against Jeju United FC.

2016–present: Solo debut, military service and departure from Woollim
Nam debuted as a solo artist with his first EP Write.. on May 9, 2016. He made an appearance on Immortal Song. In that episode, he scored 439 points, the highest score among idols in the mentioned program. In 2017, Nam joins a sitcom titled Unusual Men and Women.

In 2018, Nam joined a musical titled I Love You, You're Perfect, Now Change in Osaka, Japan. The musical is a musical comedy with various show from youth to elder. He was cast on a photography variety show Photo People 2. The show was filmed in Tokyo and was broadcast on June 11. Nam joined a musical titled Barnum:The Greatest Showman, which was held in Seoul, South Korea from August to October 28, 2018.

On September 3, 2018, Nam released his second EP, Second Write... The lead single is titled "If Only You Are Fine." Nam had been appeared on Happy together 4 as guest on Ep 563. He once again become a guest on Happy together 4 as special MC, showing his best MC-ing skills.

Nam held his first solo concert Arbor Day from November 2 to 4 at the Hannam-dong Blue Square and all the tickets sold out in two minutes. On October 26, 2018, the musical The Days release Nam to be join cast of musical, held at Bluesquare Interpark Hall in Seoul from February 22 to May 6, 2019 as Kang Moo-young, where he played a presidential bodyguard who went missing 20 years ago along with a mysterious female companion. On December 13, 2018, Nam also released a solo digital single "A Song For You",  which he performed in his Solo Concert.

On February 12, 2019, Nam joined the judging panel of TV Chosun Trot Audition Program Tomorrow's Miss Trot as one of the masters, a competitive survival program for female trot singers. Nam went on to release his third EP A New Journey on May 7. Also he will begin his Asian Concert tour from April 27, Taipei following Macau on June 2. Nam also joined the musical Mefisto a lead role scheduled to run from May 25 to July 28. Nam concluded his second Solo Concert "Arbor Day 2" on August 10 and 11 in Seoul.

On October 24, Nam enlisted for his mandatory military service, serving as a public service worker; he was unable to serve as an active duty soldier due to his shoulder injury from 2014. He released his second digital single on November 3 as a gift for fans during his military service. On August 5, 2021, he officially completed his service.

On October 19, 2021, Nam made his comeback with his fourth EP With.

On October 7, 2022, Nam became the final member of Infinite to leave Woollim Entertainment after deciding not to renew his contract, though he will still remain as a member of the group.

In March 2023, Nam signed a contract with Jflex.

Discography

Extended plays

Singles

Other charted songs

Songwriting credits

Filmography

Television series

Television shows

Web shows

Theatre

Solo Concerts & tours

Concert Tour
Arbor Day

Arbor Day 2

Fan Meeting

Awards and nominations

Golden Disc Awards

|-
| 2017
| Write..
| Disc Bonsang Award
|

Soribada Best K-Music Awards

|-
| 2019
| rowspan="2"|A New Journey
| Male Popularity Award
| 
|-
| 2019 
| Art-Tainer Award
|

Notes

References

1991 births
Living people
Male actors from Seoul
Singers from Seoul
South Korean male idols
South Korean pop singers
South Korean male singers
South Korean male dancers
South Korean male musical theatre actors
South Korean male television actors
South Korean male voice actors
Infinite (group) members
Dong-ah Institute of Media and Arts alumni